Bryotropha azovica is a moth of the family Gelechiidae. It is found in Bulgaria, Greece, North Macedonia, Cyprus, Turkey and Ukraine.

The wingspan is 11–14 mm. The forewings are ochreous brown to dark brown with a slight orange tinge. The hindwings are pale ochreous brown at the base, but substantially darker towards the apex. Adults have been recorded on wing from May to July and again from late September to early October.

References

Moths described in 1997
azovica
Moths of Europe
Moths of Asia